Stadion im. Edwarda Szymkowiaka is a multi-use stadium in Bytom, Poland. Until 1945 former name of stadium was Hindenburg Stadium. It is currently used mostly for football matches and serves as the home of Polonia Bytom. The stadium has a capacity of 5,500 people. It was opened in 1929. On 16 August 1942, the venue hosted an official football match between Germany and Romania, which ended 7–0 for Germany.

The venue is named after Edward Szymkowiak, legendary Polonia Bytom and Poland national team goalkeeper.

References 

Buildings and structures in Bytom
Bytom
Sport in Bytom
Sports venues in Silesian Voivodeship
Sports venues completed in 1929